, better known by his stage name , is the front man for Japanese synthpop group Denki Groove, which consists of himself and Takkyu Ishino. As of 2001 he was involved in an exhibit called Prince Tongha with Hideyuki Tanaka in New York City. He also frequently appears as an actor in film and on television.

Selected filmography

Films
Red Shadow (2001)
1980 (2003)
Survive Style 5+ (2004)
Linda Linda Linda (2005)
Lorelei: The Witch of the Pacific Ocean (2005)
Sway (2006)
Rainbow Song (2006)
Ten Nights of Dreams (2007)
10 Promises to My Dog (2008)
One Million Yen Girl (2008)
School Days with a Pig (2008)
Rakugo Story (2010)
The Floating Castle (2012)
The Devil's Path (2013) – Sudō
Like Father, like Son (2013)
Parasyte: Part 1 (2014)
Attack on Titan (2015)
Twisted Justice (2016)
Shin Godzilla (2016)
Rage (2016)
Fueled: The Man They Called Pirate (2016) – Fujimoto
Outrage Coda (2017) – Hanada
The Blood of Wolves (2018) – Ginji
Sunny/32 (2018)
A Gambler's Odyssey 2020 (2019)
Miyamoto (2019)
Samurai Shifters (2019)
Romance Doll (2020) – Kaoru Kubota
Zokki (2021)
Fukuda-mura Jiken (2023)

Television
Amachan (2013)
Gunshi Kanbei (2014) – Hachisuka Koroku
Toto Neechan (2016) – Sōkichi Morita
Rikuoh (2017) – Kenji Obara
The Naked Director (2019) – Wada  
Idaten (2019) – Shinsaku Kurosaka

Animation
Hakaba Kitarō (2008)
Super Crooks (2021) – Gladiator

Video games

Dubbing

Discography

Legal issues
In March 2019, Taki was arrested on suspicion of cocaine use and his latest video game, Judgment, was withdrawn from sale by the publisher, Sega. His appearance has been removed in the Western release. He was later released on bail on April 4, 2019. Having admitted to using cocaine, the Tokyo District court sentenced him to eighteen months in prison, suspended for three years.

His voice acting roles were also replaced such as Olaf from Frozen. Home video releases of Frozen were removed in Japan.

Since then, Shunsuke Takeuchi became the new Japanese dub voice of Olaf.

References

External links

 

1967 births
Living people
Japanese male film actors
Japanese male television actors
Japanese male video game actors
Japanese male voice actors
Japanese techno musicians
Sony Music Entertainment Japan artists
Place of birth missing (living people)
Musicians from Shizuoka Prefecture
Actors from Shizuoka Prefecture
Male voice actors from Shizuoka Prefecture
21st-century Japanese male actors
20th-century Japanese male singers
20th-century Japanese singers
21st-century Japanese male singers
21st-century Japanese singers